Juan Manuel Albendea Pabón (Cabra, Spain, 8 June 1937 – 2 January 2022) was a Spanish politician, lawyer and economist.

He was a member of the Spanish People's Party (PP). He was first elected to represent Seville in the Spanish Congress in 1996, and was re-elected in 2000, 2004 and 2008.

He qualified as a lawyer and became involved in business and economic law and the Direction of Companies. He became a high executive in the financial sector and a member of the Regional Executive Committee of Andalusia. Albendea Pabón was also Second Vice-president of the Commission of Justice, and contributed to the Commission of Economy and Property, Public Administrations, and Communication.

Albendea Pabon was married and had seven children. He died on 2 January 2022, at the age of 84.

References

External links
 Biography at Spanish Congress site

1937 births
2022 deaths
People from the Province of Córdoba (Spain)
Spanish economists
20th-century Spanish lawyers
People's Party (Spain) politicians
Members of the 6th Congress of Deputies (Spain)
Members of the 7th Congress of Deputies (Spain)
Members of the 8th Congress of Deputies (Spain)
Members of the 9th Congress of Deputies (Spain)